Black Swan is a 2010 American psychological horror film directed by Darren Aronofsky from a screenplay by Mark Heyman, John McLaughlin, and Andres Heinz, based on a story by Heinz. The film stars Natalie Portman, Vincent Cassel, Mila Kunis, Barbara Hershey, and Winona Ryder, and revolves around a production of Tchaikovsky's Swan Lake by the New York City Ballet company. The production requires a ballerina to play the innocent and fragile White Swan, for which the committed dancer Nina Sayers (Portman) is a perfect fit, as well as the dark and sensual Black Swan, which are qualities better embodied by the new rival Lily (Kunis). Nina is overwhelmed by a feeling of immense pressure when she finds herself competing for the role, causing her to lose her tenuous grip on reality and descend into madness.

Aronofsky conceived the premise by connecting his viewings of a production of Swan Lake with an unrealized screenplay about understudies and the notion of being haunted by a double, similar to the folklore surrounding doppelgängers. Aronofsky cites Fyodor Dostoevsky's The Double as another inspiration for the film. The director also considered Black Swan a companion piece to his 2008 film The Wrestler, with both films involving demanding performances for different kinds of art. He and Portman first discussed the project in 2000, and after a brief attachment to Universal Pictures, Black Swan was produced in New York City in 2009 by Fox Searchlight Pictures. Portman and Kunis trained in ballet for several months before filming began.

Black Swan premiered at the 67th Venice International Film Festival on September 1, 2010, and had a limited release in the United States starting on December 3, before opening in wide release on December 17. Upon its release, the film received critical acclaim, with particular praise toward Aronofsky's direction and the performances of Portman and Kunis. It was also a commercial success, grossing $329 million worldwide against a $13 million budget. The film received five nominations at the 83rd Academy Awards, including Best Picture, with Portman winning Best Actress; it also received four nominations at the 68th Golden Globe Awards, including Best Motion Picture – Drama, with Portman winning Best Actress. In 2021, Portman's performance was included in The New Yorkers list of the best film performances of the 21st century.

Plot
Nina Sayers, a young ballerina with the New York City Ballet company, lives with her overprotective mother, Erica, herself a former dancer. The company is opening the season with Tchaikovsky's Swan Lake. After forcing prima ballerina Elizabeth "Beth" MacIntyre into retirement, artistic director Thomas Leroy announces he is looking for a new dancer for the dual roles of the innocent and fragile White Swan Odette and the sensual and dark Black Swan Odile. Nina auditions for the roles and gives a flawless rehearsal as Odette, but fails to embody Odile.

The next day, Nina asks Thomas to reconsider her role. When he forcibly kisses her, she bites him and runs out of his office. Later that day, Nina sees the cast list and discovers to her surprise she has received the lead role. At a gala celebrating the new season, an intoxicated Beth accuses Nina of providing sexual favors to Thomas in return for a promotion. The next day, Nina hears Beth was hit by a car, but Thomas believes she was attempting suicide. Nina visits an unconscious Beth in the hospital and sees to her horror that her legs have been severely injured, meaning she will be unable to perform as a ballet dancer again.

During rehearsals, Thomas tells Nina to observe a newcomer, Lily, who has a physical resemblance to Nina but also an uninhibited quality Nina lacks. Nina has hallucinations and finds scratch marks on her back.

One night, despite Erica's objection, Nina accepts Lily's invitation to go out for drinks. Lily offers Nina an ecstasy capsule, saying it would help her relax. Nina turns it down at first, but then accepts. She repeats Lily's assurance that the effects will only last for a few hours, and quickly begins to act under the ecstasy's influence. Nina flirts with men at the bar and Lily as well. The two dance at a nightclub and return to Nina's apartment late that night. After arguing with her mother, Nina barricades herself in her room and Lily performs oral sex on her. The next morning, she wakes up alone and realizes that she is late for the dress rehearsal.

Upon arriving at Lincoln Center, Nina sees Lily dancing as Odile and confronts her about their night together. She seems confused by Nina's insinuation that they had sex and denies going home with Nina, saying she went home with one of the men from the bar. Nina becomes convinced Lily intends to take her place, especially after learning that Thomas has made Lily her alternate. Nina's hallucinations grow stronger and her injuries increase, going as far as hallucinating herself transforming into Odile. On opening night, she shouts to her mother, "I'm the swan queen, you're the one who never left the corps!", after her mother tells her she called the theater and told them Nina was not well enough to perform and tries to convince Nina that the role has been too much for her. As Nina is late, Lily is prepared to replace her. Nina confronts Thomas, who is impressed by her newfound confidence and allows her to take back her roles.

Towards the end of the ballet's second act, Nina is distracted by another hallucination and loses her stability as Odette. This causes the male dancer playing the prince to drop her on stage, which  infuriates Thomas. She returns to her dressing room and finds Lily preparing as Odile. During a confrontation, Lily transforms into Nina. The two fight, breaking a mirror. Nina stabs her doppelgänger with a large shard of glass from the mirror, killing her. The body reverts to Lily. Nina hides the corpse in the bathroom, and takes the stage, dancing flawlessly as Odile and seemingly turns into a black swan, her arms covered in feathers. Amidst a standing ovation from the audience, Nina surprises Thomas with a passionate kiss and returns to her dressing room.

As Nina resumes the Odette tutu and white swan makeup, she hears a knock at her door. She opens it to find Lily alive. Lily apologizes for the misunderstanding and congratulates her before taking her to leave. Confused, Nina sees the mirror is still broken; but the towel she used to mop up the blood is cleanthere is no corpse. She looks down and pulls a piece of glass from her abdomen, realizing she stabbed herselfnot Lily.

Nina dances the final act of the ballet, which ends with Odette throwing herself off a cliff and Nina landing on a mattress. The theater erupts in thunderous applause while Thomas, Lily, and the others gather to congratulate Nina, who remains lying on the mattress. Thomas sees the blood spreading at her waist and shouts for help. He frantically asks Nina what happened to her. Nina calmly replies that she was perfect as the screen fades to white.

Cast
During the closing credits, the major cast members are credited both as their film characters as well as their corresponding characters from Swan Lake.
 Natalie Portman as Nina Sayers/White Swan/Odette
 Mila Kunis as Lily/Black Swan/Odile
 Vincent Cassel as Thomas Leroy/The Gentleman
 Barbara Hershey as Erica Sayers/The Queen
 Winona Ryder as Elizabeth "Beth" MacIntyre/The Dying Swan
 Benjamin Millepied as David Moreau/Prince Siegfried
 Ksenia Solo as Veronica/Little Swan
 Kristina Anapau as Galina/Little Swan
 Janet Montgomery as Madeline/Little Swan
 Sebastian Stan as Andrew/Suitor
 Toby Hemingway as Tom/Suitor
 Sergio Torrado as Sergio/Von Rothbart
 Mark Margolis as Mr. Fithian/Patron
 Tina Sloan as Mrs. Fithian/Patron

Production

Conception

Darren Aronofsky first became interested in ballet when his sister studied dance at the High School of Performing Arts in New York City. The basic idea for the film started when he hired screenwriters to rework a screenplay called The Understudy, which portrayed off-Broadway actors and explored the notion of being haunted by a double. Aronofsky said the screenplay had elements of All About Eve, Roman Polanski's The Tenant, and Fyodor Dostoyevsky's novella The Double. The director had also seen numerous productions of Swan Lake, and he connected the duality of the White Swan and the Black Swan to the script. When researching for the production of Black Swan, Aronofsky found ballet to be "a very insular world" whose dancers were "not impressed by movies". Regardless, the director found active and inactive dancers to share their experiences with him. He also stood backstage to see the Bolshoi Ballet perform at the Lincoln Center for the Performing Arts.

Aronofsky called Black Swan a companion piece to his previous film The Wrestler, recalling one of his early projects about a love affair between a wrestler and a ballerina. He eventually separated the wrestling and the ballet worlds as "too much for one movie". He compared the two films: "Wrestling some consider the lowest art—if they would even call it art—and ballet some people consider the highest art. But what was amazing to me was how similar the performers in both of these worlds are. They both make incredible use of their bodies to express themselves." About the psychological thriller nature of Black Swan, actress Natalie Portman compared the film's tone to Polanski's 1968 film Rosemary's Baby, while Aronofsky said Polanski's Repulsion (1965) and The Tenant (1976) were "big influences" on the final film. Actor Vincent Cassel also compared Black Swan to Polanski's early works and additionally compared it to David Cronenberg's early works.

Casting

Aronofsky first discussed with Portman the possibility of a ballet film in 2000, and he found she was interested in playing a ballet dancer. Portman explained being part of Black Swan, "I'm trying to find roles that demand more adulthood from me because you can get stuck in a very awful cute cycle as a woman in film, especially being such a small person." Portman suggested to Aronofsky that her good friend Mila Kunis would be perfect for the role. Kunis contrasted Lily with Nina, "My character is very loose ... She's not as technically good as Natalie's character, but she has more passion, naturally. That's what [Nina] lacks." The female characters are directed in the Swan Lake production by Thomas Leroy, played by Cassel. He compared his character to George Balanchine, who co-founded New York City Ballet and was "a control freak, a true artist using sexuality to direct his dancers".

Portman and Kunis started training six months before the start of filming in order to attain a body type and muscle tone more similar to those of professional dancers. Portman worked out for five hours a day, doing ballet, cross-training, and swimming. A few months closer to filming, she began choreography training. Kunis engaged in cardio and Pilates, "train[ing] seven days a week, five hours, for five, six months total, and ... was put on a very strict diet of 1,200 calories a day." She lost 20 pounds from her normal weight of about 117 pounds, and reported that Portman "became smaller than I did." Kunis said, "I did ballet as a kid like every other kid does ballet. You wear a tutu and you stand on stage and you look cute and twirl. But this is very different because you can't fake it. You can't just stay in there and like pretend you know what you're doing. Your whole body has to be structured differently." Georgina Parkinson, a ballet mistress from the American Ballet Theatre (ABT), coached the actors in ballet. ABT soloists Sarah Lane and Maria Riccetto served as "dance doubles" for Portman and Kunis respectively. Dancer Kimberly Prosa also served as a double for Portman. She stated: "Natalie took class, she studied for several months, from the waist up is her. Sarah Lane, a soloist at ABT, did the heavy tricks, she did the fouettés, but they only had her for a limited time, a couple of weeks, so I did the rest of whatever dance shots they needed."

In addition to the soloist performances, members of the Pennsylvania Ballet were cast as the corps de ballet, backdrop for the main actors' performances. Also appearing in the film are Kristina Anapau, Toby Hemingway, Sebastian Stan, and Janet Montgomery.

Development and filming

Aronofsky and Portman first discussed a ballet film in 2000, after the release of Requiem for a Dream, though the script had not yet been written. He told her about a love scene between competing ballet dancers, and Portman recalled, "I thought that was very interesting because this movie is in so many ways an exploration of an artist's ego and that narcissistic sort of attraction to yourself and also repulsion with yourself." On the decade's wait before production, she said, "The fact that I had spent so much time with the idea ... allowed it to marinate a little before we shot."

The screenplay The Understudy was written by Andres Heinz; Aronofsky first heard about it while editing his second film Requiem for a Dream (2000) and described it as "All About Eve with a double, set in the off-Broadway world." After making The Fountain (2006), Aronofsky and producer Mike Medavoy had screenwriter John McLaughlin rewrite The Understudy; Aronofsky said McLaughlin "took my idea of Swan Lake and the ballet and put [the story] into the ballet world and changed the title to Black Swan." When Aronofsky proposed a detailed outline of Black Swan to Universal Pictures, the studio decided to fast-track development of the project in January 2007. The project "sort of died, again" according to Aronofsky, until after the making of The Wrestler (2008), when he had Mark Heyman, director of development of Aronofsky's production company Protozoa Pictures, write for Black Swan "and made it something that was workable." By June 2009, Universal had placed the project in turnaround, generating attention from other studios and specialty divisions, particularly with actress Portman attached to star. Black Swan began development under Protozoa Pictures and Overnight Productions, the latter financing the film. In July 2009, Kunis was cast.

Fox Searchlight Pictures distributed Black Swan and gave the film a production budget of $10–12 million. Principal photography was achieved using Super 16 mm cameras and began in New York City toward the end of 2009. Part of filming took place at the Performing Arts Center at State University of New York at Purchase. Aronofsky filmed Black Swan with a muted palette and a grainy style, which he intended to be similar to The Wrestler. Aronofsky said:

Cinematographer Matthew Libatique shot the film on 16mm film.

Musical soundtrack

The non-original music featured in Black Swan consists of music by Tchaikovsky featuring performances on-screen and in the soundtrack by violinist Tim Fain and a track of electronica dance music by English production duo The Chemical Brothers. It marks the fifth consecutive collaboration between Aronofsky and English composer Clint Mansell, who composed the original score for the film. Mansell attempted to score the film based on Tchaikovsky's ballet but with radical changes to the music. Because of the use of Tchaikovsky's music, the score was deemed ineligible to be entered into the 2010 Academy Awards for Best Original Score.

The Chemical Brothers' music, which is featured prominently during the club scene in Black Swan, is omitted from the soundtrack album.

Release

Black Swan had its world premiere as the opening film at the 67th Venice Film Festival on September 1, 2010. It received a standing ovation whose length Variety said made it "one of the strongest Venice openers in recent memory". The festival's artistic director Marco Mueller had chosen Black Swan over The American (starring George Clooney) for opening film, saying, "[It] was just a better fit ... Clooney is a wonderful actor, and he will always be welcome in Venice. But it was as simple as that." Black Swan screened in competition and is the third consecutive film directed by Aronofsky to premiere at the festival, following The Fountain and The Wrestler. Black Swan was presented in a sneak screening at the Telluride Film Festival on September 5, 2010. It also had a Gala screening at the 35th Toronto International Film Festival later in the month. In October 2010, Black Swan was screened at the New Orleans Film Festival, the Austin Film Festival, and the BFI London Film Festival. In November 2010, the film was screened at American Film Institute's AFI Fest in Los Angeles, the Denver Film Festival and Camerimage Festival in Bydgoszcz, Poland.

The release of Black Swan in the United Kingdom was brought forward from February 11 to January 21, 2011. According to The Independent, the film was considered one of "the most highly anticipated" films of late 2010. The newspaper then compared it to the 1948 ballet film The Red Shoes in having "a nightmarish quality ... of a dancer consumed by her desire to dance".

Box office
Black Swan had a limited release in select cities in North America on December 3, 2010, in 18 theaters and was a surprise box office success. The film took in a total of $415,822 on its opening day, averaging $23,101 per theater. By the end of its opening weekend it grossed $1,443,809—$80,212 per theater. The per location average was the second highest for the opening weekend of 2010 behind The King's Speech. The film is Fox Searchlight Pictures' highest per-theater average gross ever, and it ranks 21st on the all-time list. On its second weekend the film expanded to 90 theaters, and grossed $3.3 million, ranking it as the sixth film at the box-office. In its third weekend, it expanded again to 959 theaters and grossed $8,383,479. The film went on to gross over $106 million in the United States and over $329 million worldwide.

Home media
The film was released on DVD and Blu-ray Disc in Region 1/Region A on March 29, 2011. The Region 2/Region B version was released on May 16, 2011.

Reception

Critical response

Review aggregator Rotten Tomatoes gives the film an approval rating of 85% based on 318 reviews, and an average rating of 8.20/10. The website's critical consensus reads, "Bracingly intense, passionate, and wildly melodramatic, Black Swan glides on Darren Aronofsky's bold direction—and a bravura performance from Natalie Portman." At Metacritic, which assigns a weighted average score out to reviews, the film received an average score of 79 out of 100, based on 42 critics, indicating "generally favorable reviews".

In September 2010, Entertainment Weekly reported that based on reviews from the film's screening at the Venice Film Festival, "[Black Swan] is already set to be one of the year's most love-it-or-hate-it movies." Leonard Maltin, on his blog Movie Crazy, admitted that he "couldn't stand" the film, despite praising Natalie Portman's performance. Reuters described the early response to the film as "largely positive" with Portman's performance being highly praised. The Sydney Morning Herald reported that "the film divided critics. Some found its theatricality maddening, but most declared themselves 'swept away'."

Kurt Loder of Reason magazine called the film "wonderfully creepy", and wrote that "it's not entirely satisfying; but it's infused with the director's usual creative brio, and it has a great dark gleaming look." Mike Goodridge from Screen Daily called Black Swan "alternately disturbing and exhilarating" and described the film as a hybrid of The Turning Point and Polanski's films Repulsion and Rosemary's Baby. Goodridge described Portman's performance, "[She] is captivating as Nina ... she captures the confusion of a repressed young woman thrown into a world of danger and temptation with frightening veracity." The critic also commended Cassel, Kunis, and Hershey in their supporting roles, particularly comparing Hershey to Ruth Gordon in the role of "the desperate, jealous mother". Goodridge praised Libatique's cinematography with the dance scenes and the psychologically "unnerving" scenes: "It's a mesmerising psychological ride that builds to a gloriously theatrical tragic finale as Nina attempts to deliver the perfect performance."

Kirk Honeycutt of The Hollywood Reporter gave the film a mixed review. He wrote, "[Black Swan] is an instant guilty pleasure, a gorgeously shot, visually complex film whose badness is what's so good about it. You might howl at the sheer audacity of mixing mental illness with the body-fatiguing, mind-numbing rigors of ballet, but its lurid imagery and a hellcat competition between two rival dancers is pretty irresistible." Honeycutt commended Millepied's "sumptuous" choreography and Libatique's "darting, weaving" camera work. The critic said of the thematic mashup, "Aronofsky ... never succeeds in wedding genre elements to the world of ballet ... White Swan/Black Swan dynamics almost work, but the horror-movie nonsense drags everything down the rabbit hole of preposterousness." Similarly, in a piece for The Huffington Post, Rob Kirkpatrick praised Portman's performance but compared the film's story to that of Showgirls (1995) and Burlesque (2010) while concluding Black Swan is "simply higher-priced cheese, Aronofsky's camembert to [Burlesque director Steve] Antin's cheddar. Vulture Kyle Buchanan also noted the similarities of the film's plot to the widely derided Showgirls, and said that the director Darren Aronofsky "owes a feather-tip to Paul Verhoeven's exploitation classic more than [he] might be willing to admit".

The film has been criticized for its portrayal of ballet and ballet dancers. Upon the film's release in the United Kingdom, The Guardian interviewed four professional ballet dancers in the UK: Tamara Rojo, Lauren Cuthbertson, Edward Watson, and Elena Glurjidze. Rojo called the film "lazy ... featuring every ballet cliche going." Watson felt that the film "makes [ballet] look so naff and laughable. It doesn't show why ballet is so important to us – why we would want to try so hard." The Canadian Press also reported that many Canadian ballet dancers felt that the film depicted dancers negatively and exaggerated elements of their lives but gave Portman high marks for her dance technique. In an interview with the Los Angeles Times, Gillian Murphy, a principal dancer with American Ballet Theatre praised the visual elements of the film but noted that the film presentation of the ballet world was "extreme."

Controversies
Several critics noted striking similarities between Satoshi Kon's 1997 anime film Perfect Blue and Aronofsky's Black Swan. In response to comparisons between Perfect Blue and Black Swan, Aronofsky acknowledged the similarities in 2010, but denied that Black Swan was inspired by Perfect Blue. Kon noted in his blog that he had met with Aronofsky in 2001.

Costume design
Amy Westcott is credited as the costume designer and received several award nominations. A publicized controversy arose regarding the question of who had designed 40 ballet costumes for Portman and the dancers. An article in the British newspaper The Independent suggested those costumes had actually been created by Rodarte's Kate and Laura Mulleavy. Westcott challenged that view and stated that in all only seven costumes, among them the Black and White Swan, had been created in a collaboration between Rodarte, Westcott, and Aronofsky. Furthermore, the corps ballet's costumes were designed by Zack Brown (for the American Ballet Theatre), and slightly adapted by Westcott and her costume design department. Westcott said: "Controversy is too complimentary a word for two people using their considerable self-publicising resources to loudly complain about their credit once they realized how good the film is."

Dance double

ABT dancer Sarah Lane served as a "dance double" for Portman in the film. In a March 3 blog entry for Dance Magazine, editor-in-chief Wendy Perron asked: "Do people really believe that it takes only one year to make a ballerina? We know that Natalie Portman studied ballet as a kid and had a year of intensive training for the film, but that doesn't add up to being a ballerina. However, it seems that many people believe that Portman did her own dancing in Black Swan." This led to responses from Benjamin Millepied and Aronofsky, who both defended Portman, as well as a response from Lane claiming that she has not been given due credit.

Accolades and awards

Black Swan appeared on many critics' top ten lists of 2010 and is frequently considered to be one of the best films of the year. It was featured on the American Film Institute's 10 Movies of the Year. On January 25, 2011, the film was nominated for five Academy Awards (Best Picture, Best Director, Best Actress, Best Cinematography and Best Film Editing) and won one for Portman's performance.

References

External links

 

2010 LGBT-related films
2010 drama films
2010 films
2010 horror films
2010 horror thriller films
2010 independent films
2010 psychological thriller films
2010 thriller drama films
2010s English-language films
2010s dance films
2010s horror drama films
2010s psychological horror films
American LGBT-related films
American dance films
American horror drama films
American horror thriller films
American independent films
American psychological horror films
American psychological thriller films
American thriller drama films
BAFTA winners (films)
Cross Creek Pictures films
Dune Entertainment films
Fiction with unreliable narrators
Magic realism films
Films about ballet
Films about dysfunctional families
Films about schizophrenia
Films about sexual repression
Films directed by Darren Aronofsky
Films featuring a Best Actress Academy Award-winning performance
Films featuring a Best Drama Actress Golden Globe-winning performance
Films produced by Brian Oliver
Films scored by Clint Mansell
Films set in New York City
Films shot in New York City
Fox Searchlight Pictures films
Independent Spirit Award for Best Film winners
Lesbian-related films
LGBT-related drama films
LGBT-related controversies in film
LGBT-related horror thriller films
Films about mother–daughter relationships
Phoenix Pictures films
Protozoa Pictures films
Swan Lake
Films shot in 16 mm film
2010s American films